Charlotte Day Wilson (born 1993) is a Canadian contemporary R&B singer-songwriter. She came to prominence in the mid-2010s with her single "Work" and collaborations with other Toronto-based artists like BadBadNotGood and Daniel Caesar. Wilson released her debut album Alpha in July 2021.

Life and career
A native of Toronto, Ontario, Wilson studied classical piano in childhood before teaching herself production via GarageBand as a teenager. She moved to Halifax, Nova Scotia to study music at university, but left school to focus on her music career. Wilson identifies as queer.

She self-released the EP Palimpsest in 2012, and followed up with the standalone singles "Avondale," "Stephen," and "Montreal" in 2013 and 2014. She was also part of the funk band The Wayo, which released an EP in 2014, among other releases. She contributed vocals, keys, and saxophone.

She spent some time living in Montreal, Quebec, before returning to Toronto and interning at Arts & Crafts Productions. There, Wilson began collaborating with artists such as Daniel Caesar, River Tiber, and BadBadNotGood before releasing her second EP, CDW, in 2016.

The EP's song "Work" was nominated for the SOCAN Songwriting Prize in 2017, the EP was a longlisted nominee for the 2017 Polaris Music Prize; additionally, producer Howie Beck received a Juno Award nomination for Producer of the Year at the Juno Awards of 2017 for his contributions to "Work" and Dragonette's "High Five". Wilson's video for "Work", directed by Fantavious Fritz, won the 2018 Prism Prize. Wilson and Fritz subsequently announced that they were using the prize money to create a special grant program for emerging female video directors.

Her third EP, Stone Woman, was released in 2018. The song "Falling Apart" from that album was sampled on the 2020 James Blake track "I Keep Calling." In 2018, Vinyl Me, Please released an exclusive album that compiled CDW and Stone Woman.

In 2021, she was nominated for the Juno Award for Traditional R&B/Soul Recording of the Year for her single "Take Care of You" featuring Syd.

Alpha 
Following a May 2021 announcement, Wilson released her debut album Alpha on July 9, 2021 to favorable reviews.  Written and produced by Wilson, the album features a number of tracks co-written and produced with Toronto songwriter Jack Rochon (Jack Ro) in addition to contributions from other Toronto acts like Daniel Caesar, BadBadNotGood, Mustafa, and Merna Bishouty. Other producers include retro soul artist Thomas Brenneck, R&B producer D'Mile in collaboration with Babyface, Dylan Wiggins (Sir Dyan), and Teo Halm.

At the 2022 Juno Awards, she was nominated for Songwriter of the Year, Producer of the Year, and Traditional R&B/Soul Recording of the Year.

Discography

Albums

Singles

As guest artist 
 Harley Alexander – "Runnin' Thangz" from Gold Shirt (2015)
 froyo ma – "Spent Missing" from Pants EP (2015)
Igloohost – "Gold Tea" from Little Grids (2016)
 BADBADNOTGOOD – "In Your Eyes" from IV (2016)
 Daniel Caesar – "Transform" from Freudian (2017)
 A l l i e – "Take Me There" from Nightshade (2017)
 Local Natives – "Dark Days - Live at ACL" from Dark Days (Remixes) EP (2017)
 DJDS – "No Pain" with Khalid and Charlie Wilson from Big Wave More Fire (2018)
 KAYTRANADA – "What You Need" and "Freefall" (writing credit only) from Bubba (2019)
Loyle Carner – "Sail Away Freestyle" from Not Waving But Drowning (2019)
 James Blake – "I Keep Calling" from Before EP (2020) (sampled artist)

Awards and nominations

References

External links
 
 
 Charlotte Day Wilson on Spotify
 

Canadian women pop singers
Canadian soul singers
Canadian contemporary R&B singers
Canadian LGBT singers
Musicians from Toronto
Living people
21st-century Canadian women singers
1993 births
21st-century Canadian LGBT people